Computer-supported telecommunications applications (CSTA) is an abstraction layer for telecommunications applications.  It is independent of underlying protocols. It has a telephone device model that enables CTI applications to work with a wide range of telephone devices.  Originally developed in 1992, it has continued to be developed and refined over the years.  It is often the model that most CTI applications are built on and claim compliance with.  It became an OSI standard in July 2000.  It is currently being maintained by ECMA International.

The core of CSTA is a normalized Call Control model. Additional to the core there are Call Associated features and Physical Device features amongst others. An implementation of the standard need not provide all features, and so Profiles are provided. For example, the Basic Telephony profile provides such features as Make Call, Answer and Clear Connection.

History
CSTA has seen 3 major revisions to date.
 Phase 1 1992
 Phase 2 1994
 Phase 3 1998

Recent developments
Phase 3 of the CSTA standard saw the introduction of uaCSTA, CSTA XML and CSTA Object Model extensions. These extensions are in various states of completion but all extend the scope of CSTA.

Example of Underlying Protocols
Protocols that may be used by CSTA.
 SIP
 H.323
 ACSE/ROSE

See also
CTI
Java Telephony API
Telephony Application Programming Interface (TAPI)
Parlay Group

External links
ECMA International
CSTA III Standard
Services for Computer Supported Telecommunications Applications (CSTA) Phase III
XML Protocol for Computer Supported Telecommunications Applications (CSTA) Phase III
Web Services Description Language (WSDL) for CSTA Phase III
WS-Session - Web Services for Application Session Services
Open CSTA, an open source implementation of the CSTA protocol, phase III

Computer telephony integration